The London 2010 International Stamp Exhibition, 8–15 May 2010 at the Business Design Centre in Islington, London, was a major international stamp exhibition that was granted FIP (Fédération Internationale de Philatélie) patronage.

Theme 
The show was part of the year-long London 2010 Festival of Stamps to mark the centenary of the accession of King George V, the philatelist king.

Controversy 
The choice of the Business Design Centre as the venue has been controversial as it has been criticised as too small and in a poor location. Attempts by David Springbett and others to develop an alternative exhibition based at the ExCeL Exhibition Centre in East London were abandoned when the FIP granted the London 2010 show patronage.

Competition classes 
The exhibition was the first to change the competitive displays halfway through and featured the following classes:

First four days:
Traditional philately
Revenues
Postal stationery
One-frame displays with a link to George V

Second four days:
Aerophilately
Postal history
Thematic philately
Youth philately

Philatelic literature was also be shown.

By changing the display frames halfway through, over 2400 frames of material were shown.

Palmares  
The Grand Prix d'Exposition went to Alan Holyoake for ‘The First Line Engraved Postage Stamps‘ (98 points).

The Best in Class awards went to the following exhibits:

 Traditional Class: Yo-Chi Kim (South Korea) for Great Joseon and Daeha Empire (1884-1909) (96 points)
 Postal History Class: Steven Walske (United States) for Heart of the West: San Francisco as a Postal Hub from 1849 to 1869 (98 points)
 Postal Stationery Class: Alan Holyoake (United Kingdom) for The Introduction and Usage of the Mulready Envelope and Letter Sheet Stationery (98 points)
 Revenue Class: Jukka Mäkinen (Finland) for Sweden, the First Revenue Stamp Issue of 1811-1844 (95 points)
 One Frame Class: Pradip Jain (India) for The Development of the Airmail Route Cairo-India 1918-1929 (94 points)
 Aerophilately Class: Peter Motson (United Kingdom) for Newfoundland Airmail Stamps & Airmail Flights: 1919-1948 (97 points)
 Thematic Philately Class: Joshua Magier (Israel) for Land Cultivation from the Beginning of Agriculture to the Present Time (97 points)
 Youth Class: Livie-Laure Tillard (Canada) for La Marianne de Briat surchargée St-Pierre et Miquelon (84 points)
 Literature Class: Ulrich Ferchenbauer (Austria) for Österreich 1850-1918 Spezial Katalog (96 points)

See also 
 London 2010 Festival of Stamps

References

External links 
 Official website.
 London Calling magazine from Stamp & Coin Mart.
 London 2010 Palmares.

2010
2010 in London
May 2010 events in the United Kingdom
History of the London Borough of Islington